Marc Schneider (born 1980), known professionally as Manny Marc, is a German rapper and DJ. He is the DJ of the South Berlin rap group Bass Crew, which consists of Frauenarzt, MC Basstard, and MC Bogy. In 1997, he founded the street gang Berlin Crime, with Frauenarzt, and in 1998 the independent label Bassboxxx. In 2006, he founded the label 'Ghetto Musik' with Frauenarzt .

Albums

Singles

References

External links

Manny Marc on Discogs
Manny Marc on MySpace

Living people
Musicians from Berlin
1980 births